The Lithuanian Riflemen's Union (LRU), also referred to as Šauliai ( for rifleman), is a paramilitary non-profit organisation supported by the Government of Lithuania. Their activities are in three main areas: military training, sport, and culture.

History

Establishment

The Lithuanian Riflemen's Union was established in Kaunas on 27 June 1919 as a shooting section within the Lithuanian Sport Union. Several historic events determined the establishment of the Union – Lithuania had just declared independence and was asserting it in the wars against the Bolshevik Red Army, the Western Russian Volunteer Army and the young Polish Armed Forces.

Vladas Putvinskis and Matas Šalčius were the most important activists behind the idea to form a Union, and Putvinskis became the first Commander of the LRU and its main ideologue. Both of them came up with the idea to form a paramilitary group at almost the same time, but the scope that they envisioned was different.
 
In 1919, Matas Šalčius together with Antanas Vienuolis-Žukauskas, Faustas Kirša and other employees at the Press Office decided to form an organisation that would be able to protect Kaunas city; they intended to call it the Steel Battalion. At the same time another initiative was launched by a group headed by Putvinskis, and they prepared a statute for the organisation. Their aim was to support the Lithuanian military in the entire Lithuanian territory. In June 1919, the Press Office employees invited Putvinskis to their meeting. Putvinskis joined the organisation that was being created and became one of the most active members.

There were many famous and important Lithuanians among the founders of the Union, including writers Antanas Vienuolis-Žukauskas, Juozas Tumas-Vaižgantas, and Balys Sruoga, poet Faustas Kirša, painter Antanas Žmuidzinavičius, zoologist Tadas Ivanauskas, and many others. In the beginning, only civilians participated in the LRU, but later on soldiers and officers started to actively join its ranks. This reflects the main aim of the organisation – to unite civilians who want to support the military.

The ideology and the guiding principles of the LRU were influenced by earlier similar organisations: Sokol in Czechoslovakia, Suojeluskunta in Finland, and a paramilitary organisation of Switzerland. Putvinskis stated that "the Riflemen's Union is an organisation of free citizens, who are volunteering their time and efforts for the sake of protecting their homeland."

Administrative division
After its establishment in 1919, the LRU quickly expanded throughout Lithuania; many guerilla fighters from the recent wars joined the Union. In the beginning, the organisation was divided into sections covering the entire Lithuanian territory, and the sections had riflemen units. In 1925, an administrative reform was carried out, dividing the organisation into regiments, in line with the administrative division of Lithuania into districts. In 1936, a separate regiment was created for railway industry workers and members of their immediate families.

Activities in 1919–1940

The LRU had three main areas of activities in 1919-1940 – culture, sport, and military training. The riflemen's units had theatres, libraries, and sport clubs alongside orchestas and military bands. The union published the weekly magazine Trimitas. The riflemen were required to educate themselves and to participate in educating the society. To help with that they aimed at building riflemen centres in all cities and towns, where the union was active, with their duty being to national defense. Centres were built in Utena, Tauragė, Alytus, and some other cities and towns. The centres served as meeting and training places for riflemen, as well as housing their clubs and administration and hosting cultural activities.

The organisation received a unique legal basis. In 1921, 1924, and 1935, laws on the LRU were passed that defined the activities of the organisation and its functions in the State. The laws aimed at restricting the autonomy of the LRU and to tie it as closely as possible to the Ministry of Defence and the armed forces. In 1935, the LRU became directly subordinate to the Chief of Defence (See the List of governments of Lithuania in 1918-1940). The law abolished dual leadership – previously the organisation was led by the Chairman of the Central Board, elected by riflemen, and by the LRU Commander, appointed by the Minister of Defence. Thus the riflemen were fully integrated in the defensive structure of the country, and the district military commanders became commanding officers of rifle regiments.

It was recorded that in 1935, the LRU had 33,276 members, of which 24,976 were soldiers. The organisation had 7,371 rifles and 32 machine guns.

By 1940, the LRU had become one of the most popular and largest organizations in the country, with about 62,000 members. Both men and women were active in the organisation. The LRU had units of university students, including student corporations Saja and Živilė. Many famous politicians (Antanas Smetona, Rapolas Skipitis, Mykolas Sleževičius, Juozas Urbšys), artists and other members of the cultural elite (Antanas Žmuidzinavičius, Unė Babickaitė-Graičiūnienė also known as Une Bay, Antanas Vienuolis-Žukauskas, Petras Vaičiūnas), scientists (Tadas Ivanauskas, Augustinas Janulaitis, Liudas Vailionis, Antanas Graugrokas) were active in the union. Even though the majority of members originated from the farmer class, the main principles of the Union were also appealing to other classes.
Members of the organization are registered in the journal

Soviet occupation
On 15 June 1940, the Soviet Union occupied Lithuania, and the riflemen, like the rest of the military, were ordered not to resist. Aleksandras Barauskas, a rifleman and a border guard, was killed by Red Army soldiers in the early morning of June 15. The new Soviet People's Government of Lithuania immediately took steps to liquidate the union. Its commander, Colonel Pranas Saladžius, was dismissed on 19 June 1940, and the Chief of Defence division General Vincas Vitkauskas, who was cooperating with the Soviets, ordered the riflemen to hand over their arms to the military on 25 June 1940. On 13 July 13, 1940 a Soviet order to liquidate the union was issued. In subsequent months, a number of the most active riflemen were arrested as "enemies of the people" and sent to various Gulag camps. In June 1941, the Soviets started a mass deportation that targeted "anti-Soviet elements", including the riflemen. Among those deported were LRU's commander Colonel Pranas Saladžius, honorary commander of the women's section Emilija Putvinskienė, commander of the Utena Regiment Lt. Col. Pranas Bronevičius, head of the culture section Vincas Daudzvaras, and others.

Remaining riflemen began forming anti-Soviet groups and played a role in the uprising of 23 June 1941, but there is no specific data on how many members participated in it.

German occupation and collaboration
On the 22 June 1941, Nazi Germany invaded the Soviet Union and also occupied the Baltic states. Initially treated as 'liberators' the situation later became one of 'passive resistance' against the Nazis. During the Nazi occupation, ex-riflemen formed several underground organisations, such as Laisvės šauliai (Freedom's Riflemen), aimed at restoring Lithuania's independence.

When the Soviets returned in mid-1944, many riflemen joined the Lithuanian partisans and fought a guerrilla war against the Soviet Union. Two out of eight guerrillas who signed the declaration of the Union of Lithuanian Freedom Fighters on 16 February 1949, were ex-riflemen: Leonardas Grigonis-Užpalis and Juozas Šibaila-Merainis. Some other ex-riflemen were also prominent among the guerrillas, including Juozas Vitkus-Kazimieraitis, Zigmas Drunga-Mykolas Jonas, Dominykas Jėčys-Ąžuolis, and Vladas Montvydas-Žemaitis.

Restoration of the Union

The first attempts to restore the LRU were made still during the occupation when the movement for reform started. On 1 June 1989, during a protest in Kaunas by a club of former exiles and the Democrat party, the restoration of the LRU was officially announced. On 20 September 1989, the activists gave an oath in Kelmė, at the grave of Putvinskis, the founder and ideologue of the LRU. That day is considered to be the day of the restoration of the LRU in Lithuania.

The members of the restored Lithuanian Riflemen's Union were active in the movement for reform, they were especially active in guarding the Lithuanian Parliament and other State buildings during the January Events in 1991 and later. On 13 January 1991, two members of Vilnius riflemen regiment were killed: Ignas Šimulionis and Darius Gerbutavičius. On May 19, at a border crossing point in Krakūnai a riflemen and a border guard Gintaras Žagunis was shot to death.

Administrative divisions

Currently, the LRU is divided into ten riflemen regiments (šaulių rinktinė):

Officer Antanas Juozapavičius 1st Territorial Riflemen Unit
Vytautas the Great 2nd Territorial Riflemen Unit 
West (Sea) Riflemen 3rd Territorial Riflemen Unit
Suvalkija 4th Territorial Riflemen Unit
Alfonso Smetono 5th Territorial Riflemen Unit
Gen. Povilo Plechavičiaus 6th Territorial Riflemen Unit
Kęstutis 7th Territorial Riflemen Unit
Samogitia 8th Territorial Riflemen Unit
Prano Saladžiaus 9th Territorial Riflemen Unit
King Mindaugas 10th Territorial Riflemen Unit

Membership

After Lithuania re-established independence in 1990, the organization was restored but it has not regained its former popularity or influence. Current membership of the Lithuanian Riflemen's Union is 10,137 (in the interwar period it was 62,000). Half of the members are Young Riflemen (11–18 years old), 40% are Combat Riflemen (18 years old until death) and the remaining are Non-combat Riflemen.

The LRU greatly values its traditions, so the activities are similar to what they were in the past: there are sport and culture activities, the LRU journal Trimitas (the Trumpet) is being published, the members are encouraged to take interest in the history of the country. 

According to the law on the Lithuanian Riflemen's Union, any Lithuanian citizen who is over 11 and speaks the official language can join the Union. The members are divided into two groups:

1. Young riflemen – youth, 11–18 years old. All young riflemen give an honorary pledge when joining the Union. The young riflemen receive training based on a 4 level programme. On each level they study Lithuanian history, receive training in leadership and military training. At the end of the level they pass an examination, and get a certificate and a sign. Starting in 2002, young riflemen summer camps, as well as summer courses and the international training camp "Žalgiris", are organised every summer.

2. Riflemen – persons over 18, who give a rifleman's oath. The riflemen are preparing for armed and unarmed resistance. The LRU Command also operates a militia band, guard of honor company, a sport and technology club. Riflemen belonging to the fighting units guard various locations in Lithuania.

The LRU operates according to a law on LRU, adopted by the Lithuanian parliament in 2010, and a Statute approved by the Ministry of Defence. The highest ruling body of the Union is the Conference of Members. It decides on the most important matters of the Organisation, adopts decisions and approves the Commander of the LRU who is selected by the Minister of Defence. The current Commander of the LRU is reserve col. lt. Liudas Gumbinas, who started his term in July 2014.

The LRU actively cooperates with the governmental institutions: the Lithuanian military, Police department, Fire and Rescue Department, Lithuanian State Border Guard Service and others.

Riflemen students

The LRU also includes a riflemen student corporation SAJA. The word "saja" is a Lithuanian neologism, coined by riflemen students for the word "corporation", when they created the first student riflemen corporation in Vytautas Magnus University in 1934. In 2007, a club for riflemen students was established, and on 19 May 2010 it became the Lithuanian riflemen student corporation SAJA.

The corporation aims to promote the riflemen union in universities and to unite riflemen students. The corporation has sections in Vilnius, Kaunas, and Klaipėda. Members participate in the activities of the LRU, help in organizing the summer camps for young riflemen, cooperate with other university organisations.

Riflemen Union in Exile
In Chicago, on 7 March 1954, the riflemen who had fled Lithuania due to World War II declared the re-establishment of the LRU, under the name of the National Guard of Lithuania in Exile. The main activists included Mantautas, Pūtvytė-Mantautienė, Valatkaitis, Kalmantas and others. Sections of the organisation were active in the United States, the UK, Canada, and Australia.

Currently, the National Guard of Lithuania in Exile forms an integral part of the LRU. It is headed by Julius Butkus and is active in the United States and Canada, and supporters both the Union and the Armed Forces.

Leadership

Commanders-in-Chief of Union 
LRU Commanders-in-Chief were:

Chairmen 

LRU Chairmen were:
 Vladas Putvinskis (1919–1922)
 Vincas Krėvė-Mickevičius (1922–1924)
 Stasys Šilingas (1924–1925)
 Matas Šalčius (1925–1926)
 Teodoras Daukantas (1926)
 Liudas Vailionis (1926–1927)
 Rapolas Skipitis (1927–1928)
 Vladas Putvinskis (1928–1929)
 Antanas Žmuidzinavičius (1929–1934)

Ranks 
National headquarters

Officers

Other ranks

Symbols
From the very beginning, the symbol of the organisation has been a double cross (Vytis cross) on a shield. This is one of the oldest heraldic symbols used in Lithuania. It is also called the Jagiellonian cross because it was used by the Polish King and the Grand Duke of Lithuania Jogaila. During the Lithuanian Wars of Independence Vytis cross became a state military award. The current statute of the LRU states that the symbol of the Union is a golden (yellow) double cross, set in a stylised frame of golden (yellow) oak leaves.

From 1919 to 1940, the riflemen received member badges with numbers. There was also a separate badge for supporters. The badges were worn not only on uniforms but also on civil clothing. The rifleman's badge is a white darkened metal shield, with a contour of a double cross inside. The height of the badge is 47 mm, and the width is 27 mm. The sign is attached by a metal wrench. A miniature of a rifleman's badge is 20 mm high and 12 mm wide.

See also

 Estonian Defence League
 Forest Brothers
 Aizsargi
 Latvian Riflemen

References

Further reading
http://www.sauliusajunga.lt/

External links
  Official site

1919 establishments in Lithuania
Military units and formations established in 1919
1940 disestablishments in Lithuania
Military units and formations disestablished in 1940
1989 establishments in Lithuania
Military units and formations established in 1989
History of Lithuania (1918–1940)
Non-profit organizations based in Lithuania
Paramilitary organizations of Lithuania
Youth organizations based in Lithuania